Sustut Lake is a lake in the Omineca Mountains of the Northern Interior of British Columbia, Canada, located northwest of Germansen Landing in the Cassiar Land District.  It is the source of the Sustut River, which flows roughly west and is a major tributary of the Skeena River.  The lake's old, or alternate, name is Bear Wallow Lake.  Sustut Peak is located to the west of the lake.

See also
Sustut Provincial Park and Protected Area

References

Omineca Mountains
Northern Interior of British Columbia
Lakes of British Columbia
Cassiar Land District